Bob McCoskrie is the National Director of the New Zealand conservative Christian non-profit NGO  Family First New Zealand. McCoskrie has a Masters of Commerce with Honours from the University of Auckland a Diploma of Teaching from the Auckland College of Education.

McCoskrie initially worked as a tertiary lecturer in accounting, commercial law and tax law at Manukau Polytechnic for four years (1986–1990) and then as the Director of Youth for Christ South Auckland in Ōtara (1990–1994) before he founded and co-ordinated the Papatoetoe Adolescent Christian Trust (1994–2002) working with at-risk youth and their families. In 1996 he was appointed a Justice of the Peace (JP). In 2002 he joined the Christian New Zealand radio station Radio Rhema as a talkback radio host and current affairs presenter on Sky TV's Shine TV.

In 2006, as a 42-year old church leader, McCoskrie founded Family First New Zealand to lobby for strong families and safe communities in New Zealand, and has been that organisation's National Director and main spokesperson since that time. In 2009 Victoria University religious studies professor Paul Morris said Family First was "successfully broadening the Christian agenda in New Zealand politics in a way never seen before". In 2020 Family First was described as "New Zealand's most formidable conservative campaigners".

McCoskrie and his wife Tina, who he married in a Methodist church in about 1989, have three children and live in South Auckland.

References

External links
McBlog: Bob McCoskrie's Blog
Family First New Zealand Website

Conservatism in New Zealand
New Zealand anti-abortion activists
New Zealand activists
New Zealand Christians
People from Auckland
Living people
Year of birth missing (living people)